Stop, Look and Listen or Stop, Look, Listen may refer to:

"Stop, Look, Listen, Think" (and similar), a procedure promoted by the Green Cross Code, a UK pedestrian safety campaign
"Stop, Look, and Listen", a railroad crossing safety phrase, often seen on crossing signs

Film and television 
 Stop, Look and Listen (film), a 1926 film featuring Oliver Hardy
 Stop Look and Listen (film) (note lack of comma), a comedy short by Chuck Menville and Len Janson
 Stop, Look and Listen (game show) or Celebrity Time, a 1948-52 American TV quiz show
 Stop, Look, Listen, a British children's programme broadcast by ITV Schools
 Stop, Look and Listen!, a Blue's Clues episode compilation video
 Stop Look Listen, a Hi-5 episode compilation image

Music 
 Stop! Look! Listen!, a 1915 Broadway musical revue
 Stop, Look & Listen (Patsy Cline album), 1986
 "Stop, Look and Listen" (song), 1956
 Stop, Look and Listen (Tommy Dorsey album), or the title song, 1994
 "Stop, Look and Listen", a song by Donna Summer from the album She Works Hard for the Money
 "Stop, Look, Listen (To Your Heart)", a song by The Stylistics, also covered by Marvin Gaye and Diana Ross
 "Stop Look and Listen", a song by Devo from Hardcore Devo: Volume One
 "Stop, Look and Listen", a song by Bill Haley & His Comets, also covered by Elvis Presley
 "Stop, Look and Listen", a song by Josie and the Pussycats from Josie and the Pussycats
 "Stop, Look, Listen", a song by MC Lyte from Eyes on This
 "Stop! Look! Listen!", a song by Da Buzz, for Melodifestivalen 2003
 Look Stop Listen, a 1983 album by Philly Joe Jones Dameronia

See also
 Stop! Look! And Hasten!, a 1954 Merrie Melodies cartoon
 Stop, Look and Laugh, a 1960 Three Stooges film
 "Stop, Look and Be Safe", an episode of Barney & Friends
 Stop! Luke! Listen!, a 1917 short comedy film featuring Harold Lloyd